An Illustrated History is the second North American album release by Japanese pop group Puffy AmiYumi, released on May 21, 2002. (See 2002 in music).

The album contains a compilation of Puffy's hits in Japan from their debut ('Asia no Junshin', albeit in English lyrics) up to the time then (most likely the whole inclusion of the Atarashii Hibi single, without the karaoke song).

At least 1 song from each of Puffy's earlier Japanese album releases before 2002 were included with the exception of solosolo.

There is also a bonus video of 'Boogie-Woogie No.5' able to be viewed on a QuickTime Player when inserted into a computer.

Track listing
Love So Pure (Andy Sturmer)
True Asia (Asia no Junshin) (English Version) (Yosui Inoue, Tamio Okuda)
That's the Way It Is (Kore ga Watashi no Ikirumichi) (Tamio Okuda)
Electric Beach Fever (Nagisa ni Matsuwaru Et Cetera) (Okuda)
Wild Girls on Circuit (Circuit no Musume) (Okuda)
Sign of Love Captain Funk's Puffy De Samba Mix (Ai no Shirushi) (Kusano Masamune)
Puffy de Rumba (Puffy AmiYumi, Tamura Yoriko)
Talalan (Tararan) (Puffy AmiYumi, Sturmer)
Sunday Girls (Nichiyoubi no Musume) (Okuda)
Friends (Tomodachi) (Puffy AmiYumi, Sturmer)
Mother (Okuda)
Neholina (Nehorina Hahorina) (Matsumoto Tortoise)
Brand New Days (Atarashii Hibi) (Puffy AmiYumi, Sturmer)
Stray Cats Fever (Masanori Sasaji)
Puffy's Rule (Puffy no Rule) (Okuda, Takashi Furuta)
Jet Police (Jet Keisatsu) (Okuda)
Bonus QuickTime music video
Boogie Woogie (No. 5) (Okuda)

References

Puffy AmiYumi albums
2002 albums